Lac du Bourdon is a lake in Bourgogne-Franche-Comté, France. At an elevation of 215 m, its surface area is 2.2 km².

Bourdon
Landforms of Yonne